Christopher Neville Charles Small (17 March 1927 – 7 September 2011) was a New Zealand-born musician, educator, lecturer, and author of a number of influential books and articles in the fields of musicology, sociomusicology and ethnomusicology. He coined the term musicking, with which he wanted to highlight that music is a process (verb) and not an object (noun.)

Biography
Small was born in Palmerston North, New Zealand, to a dentist and former schoolteacher, and was the youngest of three children.

His early school education took place at the Terrace End and Russell Street Primary Schools (1932–39), Palmerston North Boys' High School (1940–41) and Wanganui Collegiate School (1942–44). Between 1945 and 1952 he attended the University of Otago and then Victoria University College. He taught at Horowhenua College (at the same time working at Morrow Productions Ltd making educational animated films) from 1953 to 1958, and at Waihi College from 1959 to 1960.

In 1960 he was awarded a New Zealand government bursary and he spent 1961 travelling in the United Kingdom, before studying composition in London with Priaulx Rainier, where he also had contact with Bernard Rands, Luigi Nono and Witold Lutoslawski. After his studies he stayed in England, where he taught at schools, including Anstey College of Education in Birmingham. He became senior lecturer in music at Ealing College of Higher Education in London (1971–86) and he also taught at Dartington College of Arts in 1979. Between 1977 and 1986 he was adjunct professor of the history of music at Syracuse University London Centre, and a tutor in music to the summer school of the BEd course of Sussex University between 1981 and 1984.

He retired from teaching in 1986 and moved to Sitges, Spain, where he lived with his partner Neville Braithwaite (a Jamaican-born dancer, singer, and youth worker) whom he married in 2006. During his time in Spain, Small conducted Catalan choirs and was visited regularly by people from both Europe and the USA, who admired his work. In the USA his ideas have been supported by prominent musicologists such as Charles Keil, Robert Walser, Susan McClary and The Village Voice rock critic Robert Christgau.

Neville Braithwaite died in 2006, and Small died in 2011. He is survived by his sister, Rosemary.

During his lifetime he published a number of books of his own, and was a contributor in numerous articles in journals such as Music in Education, Tempo, The Musical Times, Music and Letters, and Musical America. He lectured in many educational institutions in the United Kingdom, Norway, and the United States, contributed with papers to organisations such as the Composers' Guild of Great Britain (1984), the Association of Improvising Musicians (1985), Music Educators National Conference (Hartford, Connecticut, 1985; Washington DC, 1989) and the Society for Ethnomusicology (Cambridge, Massachusetts, 1988).

Small took part in the series Sounds Different, broadcast by BBC-TV2 (July 1982), and wrote This Is Who We Are, a three-programme broadcast on BBC Radio 3 (March 1988) about Afro-American music.

Musicking
In his book of the same title (Musicking, 1998), Small argues for introducing a new word to the English dictionary – that of musicking (from the verb to music), meaning any activity involving or related to music performance. According to his own definition,

To music is to take part, in any capacity, in a musical performance, whether by performing, by listening, by rehearsing or practicing, by providing material for performance (what is called composing), or by dancing. We might at times even extend its meaning to what the person is doing who takes the tickets at the door or the hefty men who shift the piano and the drums or the roadies who set up the instruments and carry out the sound checks or the cleaners who clean up after everyone else has gone. They, too, are all contributing to the nature of the event that is a musical performance.

In expanding his ideas presented in his earlier book (Music, Society, Education, 1977), Small continues to demonstrate that musicking is an active way in which we relate to the rest of the world.

The act of musicking establishes in the place where it is happening a set of relationships, and it is in those relationships that the meaning of the act lies. They are to be found not only between those organized sounds which are conventionally thought of as being the stuff of musical meaning but also between the people who are taking part, in whatever capacity, in the performance; and they model, or stand as metaphor for, ideal relationships as the participants in the performance imagine them to be: relationships between person and person, between individual and society, between humanity and the natural world and even perhaps the supernatural world.Another book by Small is Music o the Common Tongue: Survival and Celebration in African American Music (1987), he discusses Africans and Europeans and the Making of Music. His main highlights were 1. Characteristics of African social life and 2. Europeans and the effects of slavery.

Works

Bibliography
Music, Society, Education (1977)
Schoenberg (1977)
Music of the Common Tongue: Survival and Celebration in African American Music (1987)
Musicking: The Meanings of Performing and Listening (1998)

Compositions
Actions for Chorus – Some Maori Place Names for large chorus (1974)
Black Cat for school percussion ensemble and voices (1968)
Children of the Mist, a ballet in two acts for orchestra (1960)
Concert Piece for orchestra (1963)
High Country Stockman, orchestral music for film (1952)
Suite from Children of the Mist, for orchestra (1960)
TB, for film (1955)
The Story of Soil, music for film (1954)
Trees, music for film (1952)Various Songs and Solo Piano Pieces for students and friends (1980)What on Earth is Happening music for film (1958)

 Christopher Small Collection 
In 1997, Christopher Small, retired in Sitges and donated his personal library to the University of Girona. The collection is of outstanding quality and unique in the context of catalan universities. Most of its nearly 500 volumes are centered around music and cover ethnomusicology, musical sociology, and popular music - especially afroamerican genres like jazz, blues, soul. etc.

References

Other sources
 Norman, Philip. Bibliography of New Zealand Compositions. Third Edition: Nota Bene Music (1991)
 Cohen, Mary L.  Christopher Small's Concept of Musicking: Toward a Theory of Choral Singing Pedagogy in Prison Contexts. Doctoral Dissertation, 2007, The University of Kansas
Thomson, John Mansfield. Biographical Dictionary of New Zealand Composers. Wellington: Victoria University Press (1990). p. 128–129.
Cole, Simon.  just BE here - the guide to musicking mindfulness''

External links
 Christopher Small Collection (University of Girona Library)

1927 births
2011 deaths
New Zealand musicologists
Sociomusicologists
People from Palmerston North
People educated at Palmerston North Boys' High School
People educated at Whanganui Collegiate School
University of Otago alumni
Victoria University of Wellington alumni